"One Finger and a Fist" is a song by American rock band Drowning Pool and the second single from the album Resilience. Being one of the first tracks with Jasen Moreno on lead vocals, the song was featured on WWE's Slammy Awards and offered as a free download in December 2012.  A lyric video was created for the song in January 2013 with an official video premiered in February 2013.

Charts

References 

Drowning Pool songs
2013 singles
2013 songs
Songs written by Stevie Benton
Songs written by Ryan McCombs
Songs written by John Feldmann